"I Could Have Loved You" is a song by British duo Lighthouse Family. Taken from their compilation album Greatest Hits (2002), it was released in March 2003 but didn't enter any singles charts worldwide. The song was produced by Mike Peden.

Track listing
 CD
 "I Could Have Loved You" (Album Version) — 3:59
 "End of the Sky" (Phil Bodger Mix) — 4:58
 "Lifted" (Linslee 7" Mix) — 4:00
 "I Could Have Loved You" (Music Video)

2003 singles
Lighthouse Family songs
Songs written by Paul Tucker (musician)
Songs written by Tunde Baiyewu